The Central Black Earth Region,  Central Chernozem Region or Chernozemie is a segment of the Eurasian Black Earth belt that lies within Central Russia  and comprises Voronezh Oblast, Lipetsk Oblast, Belgorod Oblast, Tambov Oblast, Oryol Oblast and Kursk Oblast. Between 1928 and 1934, these regions were briefly united into Central Black Earth Oblast, with the centre in Voronezh.

The Black Earth Region is famous for its high quality soil, called Chernozem (Black Earth). Although its importance has been primarily agricultural, the Chernozem Region was developed by the Soviets as an industrial region based on iron ores of the Kursk Magnetic Anomaly.

The area contains a biosphere nature reserve called Central Black Earth Nature Reserve. It was created in 1935 within the Kursk and Belgorod oblasts. A prime specimen of forest steppe in Europe, the nature reserve consists of typical virgin land (tselina) steppes and deciduous forests.

 was the First Secretary of Communist Party's Regional Committee for the Central Black Earth Region (1928–1934).

History

On May 14, 1928, the All-Russian Central Executive Committee and Government of the Russian Soviet Federative Socialist Republic passed a directive on the formation of the Central Black Earth Oblast using the territory of the former Voronezh, Kursk, Oryol and  Tambov Governorate Governorates with its centre as the city of Voronezh.

On July 16, 1928 the composition of the Central Black Earth Oblast was determined and on July 30 of the same year its districts were founded. Later, from 1929 to 1933, these districts were revised several times.

On June 3, 1929 the centre of the region, Voronezh, was designated as an independent administrative unit directly subordinate to the regional Congress of Soviets and its executive committee.

On September 16, 1929 the Voronezh Okrug was abolished and its territory was split among the newly founded Stary Oskol and Usman Okrugs.

See also
 Central Black Earth economic region

References

Geography of Russia
Regions of Russia
Chernozemye